Volney G. Bennett Lumber Company is located in Camden, Camden County, New Jersey, United States. The building was built in 1904 and was added to the National Register of Historic Places on August 5, 1993.

See also

National Register of Historic Places listings in Camden County, New Jersey

References

Commercial buildings on the National Register of Historic Places in New Jersey
Buildings and structures completed in 1904
Buildings and structures in Camden, New Jersey
National Register of Historic Places in Camden County, New Jersey
New Jersey Register of Historic Places